OGLE-2017-BLG-1522Lb is an exoplanet thought to be orbiting a brown dwarf. It was discovered by KMTNet and the OGLE in 2018.

See also
List of exoplanets discovered in 2018

References

Exoplanets detected by microlensing
Giant planets
Exoplanets discovered in 2018